Kangra district is the most populous district of the Indian state of Himachal Pradesh. Dharamshala is the administrative headquarters of the district.

History

The history of Pre-Aryan and Aryan eras is mainly based on the epics like Vedas, Puranas, Mahabharata, etc. In Rigveda, reference of Arijikya (Beas) flowing through this area has been made. This region, commonly named as Dev Bhumi is believed to be the abode of gods. There is a mention of Trigarta (Kangra) kingdom in Mahabharata. Sir Lepel Griffin refers to the Rajput dynasties of the hills of whom the Katochs’ are the oldest. In Mahabharata there is a mention of King Susharama Chandra, who sided with the Kaurvas. He is said to be the founder of this dynasty. At that time, Kangra was probably named as Bhim Kot. The reference to prosperous Kingdom of Trigarta (Kangra) is also found in the Paninian literature that was written sometimes between the seventh and fourth centuries B.C. The mention of Kangra (Nagarkot) was found in the works of Ferishta.

Hiuen Tsang, a Chinese traveller, visited India from AD 629 to 644 during Harshvardhana’s rule. In his accounts, he has mentioned about many kings ruling in this region. It is also gathered that king Harshvardhana annexed the state of Kangra. It was in the beginning when these outsiders tried to establish their power that the kings of the area stood in their way. He also found the Jullundur monarchy still undivided. At some later period, perhaps that of the Muhammadan invasion, the Katoch princes were driven into the hills, where Kangra already existed as one of their chief fortress. In spite of constant invasions, the little Hindu kingdoms, secure within their Himalayan glens, long held out against the aggressive Muhammadan power. In 1009, the riches of the Nagarkot temple attracted the attention of Mahmud of Ghazni, who defeated the Hindu princes at Peshawar, seized the fort of Kangra and plundered the shrine of an immense booty in gold, silver and jewels. From this time, Kangra does not reappear in general history till 1360, when the emperor Firoz Tughlak again led a force against it. The Raja gave in his submission, and was permitted to retain his dominions; but the Muhammadans once more plundered the temple.

In 1556, Akbar launched an expedition into the hills, and occupied the fort of Kangra. The fruitful valley became an imperial demesne, and only the barren hills remained in the possession of the native chiefs. In the graphic language of Todar Mal, Akbar’s minister, ‘he cut off the meat and left the bones. Yet the remoteness of the imperial capital and the natural strength of the mountain fastnesses encouraged the Rajput princes to rebel; and it was not until after the imperial forces have been twice repulsed that the fort of Kangra was starved into surrender to an army commanded by prince Khurram in person (1620). At one time Jahangir intended to build a residence in the valley, and the site of the proposed palace is still pointed out in the lands of the village of Gargari. Probably, the superior attractions of Kashmir, which the emperor shortly afterwards visited, led to the abandonment of his design. At the accession of Shah Jahan the hill Rajas had quietly settled down into the position of tributaries and the commands of the emperor were received and executed with read obedience. Letters patent(sanadas) are still extant, issued between the reign of Akbar and Aurangzeb, appointing individuals to various judicial and revenue offices, such as that of kazi, kanungo, or chaudhri. In some instances the present representatives of the family continue to enjoy privileges and powers conferred on their ancestors by the Mughal emperors, the honorary appellation being retained even where the duties have become obsolete. During the period of Muhammadan ascendancy, the hill princes appear to have been treated liberally. They still enjoyed a considerable share of power, and ruled unmolested over the extensive tracts which remained to them. They built forts, waged wars upon each other, and wielded the functions of petty sovereigns. The loyalty of the hill Rajas appears to have won the favour and confidence of their conquerors, and they were frequently deputed on hazardous expeditions and appointed to places of high trust in the service of the empire. For instance, in 1758 Raja Ghamand Chand of Kangra was appointed governor of the Jullundur Doab and the hill country between the Sutluj and the Ravi.

In 1752, the Katoch principalities nominally formed part of the territories ceded to Ahmad Shah Durrani by the declining Delhi court. But the native chieftains, emboldened by the prevailing anarchy, resumed their practical independence, and left little to the Durrani monarch or the deputy who still held the isolated fort of Kangra for the Mughal empire. In 1774, the Sikh chieftain, Jai Singh, obtained the fort by stratagem, but relinquished it in 1785 to Sansar Chand, the legitimate Rajput prince of Kangra, to whom the State was thus restored about two centuries after its occupation by Akbar. This prince, by his vigorous measures, made himself supreme throughout the whole Katoch country and levied tribute from his fellow chieftains in all the neighbouring States. For twenty years he reigned supreme through out these hills, and raised his name to a height of renown never attained by any ancestor of his race. He found himself unable, however, to cope with the Sikhs, and two descents upon the Sikh possessions in the plains, in 1803 and 1804, were repelled by Ranjit Singh.

In 1805, Sansar Chand attacked the hill State of Bilaspur (Kahlur), which called in the dangerous aid of the Gurkhas, already masters of the wide tract between the Gogra and the Sutlej. The Gurkhas responded by crossing the latter river and attacking the Katochs at Mahal Mori, in May, 1806. The invaders gained a complete victory, overran a large part of the hill country of Kangra, and kept up a constant warfare with the Rajput chieftains who still retained the remainder. The people fled as refugees to the plains, while the minor princes aggravated the general disorder by acts of anarchy on their own account. The horrors of the Gurkha invasion still burn in the memories of the people. The country ran with blood, not a blade of cultivation was to be seen, and grass grew and tigers whelped in the streets of the deserted towns. At length, after three years of anarchy, Sansar Chand determined to invoke the assistance of the Sikhs. Ranjit Singh, always ready to seize upon every opportunity for aggression, entered Kangra and gave battle to the Gurkhas in August, 1809.

After a long and furious contest, the Maharaja was successful, and the Gurkhas abandoned their conquests beyond the Sutlej. Ranjit Singh at first guaranteed to Sansar Chand, the possession of all his dominions except the fort of Kangra and 66 villages, allotted for the support of the garrison; but he gradually made encroachments upon all the hill chieftains. Sansar Chand died in 1824, an obsequious tributary of Lahore. His son, Anrudh Chand, succeeded him, but after a reign of four years abandoned his throne, and retired to Hardwar, rather than submit to a demand from Ranjit Singh for the hand of his sister in marriage to a son of the Sikh minister Dhian Singh. Immediately after Anrudh’s flight in 1828, Ranjit Singh attached the whole of his territory, and the last portion of the once powerful Kangra State came finally into the possession of the Sikhs.

Kangra passed to the British at the end of the first Sikh War in 1846 and there were several revolts against the British. Ram Singh, a Pathania Rajput, invaded the British garrison at Shahpur. The British immediately rushed their forces, which surrounded Shahpur fort. Ram Singh finding himself at a disadvantageous position sneaked into the nearby forest to rearm himself. After the outbreak of the Mutiny in 1857, some disturbances took place in the Kulu subdivision; but the vigorous measures of precaution adopted by the local authorities, and the summary execution of the six ring leaders and imprisonment of others on the occasion of the first over act of rebellion, effectually subdued any tendency to lawlessness. The disarming of the native troops in the forts of Kangra and Nurpur was effected quietly and without opposition.

The national movement in Kangra district was spearheaded by Comrade Ram Chandra, Thakur Panchan Chandra and Baba Kanshi Ram. Baba Kanshi Ram did a great deal for liberation movement in Kangra district. He was responsible for the liberation wave in hills. He was given the title of “Hill Gandhi” by Jawahar Lal Nehru for his work and “Bulbule Hills” for his melodious throat by Sarojini Naidu. With the freedom of British India, Kangra district automatically threw away the foreign yoke and entered into the era of democracy.

Demographics

According to the 2011 census Kangra district had population of 1,510,075. Its population growth rate over the decade 2001-2011 was 12.77%. 5.71% of the population lives in urban areas. Kangra district has a sex ratio of 1012 females per 1000 males and a literacy rate of 85.67%. Scheduled Castes and Scheduled Tribes made up 21.15% and 5.60% of the population respectively.

District highlights of 2011 Census
 Kangra district has the highest number of 3,869 villages among the 12 district of the state.
 Kangra district stands 1st position in terms of its working force having total workers of 675,170 persons against 3,559,422 working persons of the state.
 Kangra district occupies 1st rank among the districts of the state in terms of literate population. It has a literate population of 1,152,640 persons.
 The economy of Kangra district is mainly depends on agriculture. It has returned 303,007 persons as cultivators and holds the 2nd position among the districts of the state
 All the inhabited villages of the district enjoy the facility of electricity and potable drinking water.
 Kangra district is also known for its attractive tourist destinations. Dharamsala, Kangra, Palampur, Baijnath, Jawalamukhi and Masroor are the famous places of tourist interest in the district. McLeodganj in Dharamsala is a seat of the Dalai Lama has become a place of international fame since 1966.
 Central University of Himachal Pradesh at Dharamsala in Kangra district was established on 20 March 2009 under the Central University Act 2009(No.25 of 2009) of Indian Parliament.

The native people are the Kangri people and the native language is Kangri, which is very similar to Dogri.  The majority of the people are Hindu, although many Tibetans and others who follow Buddhism have also settled here recently. There are also other minorities such as Sikhs, Muslims, and Christians.

Jhamakda is a folk dance of Kangra. It is exclusively performed by women. It features percussion instruments and songs.

Religion 

{| class="wikitable sortable"
|+ Religion in Kangra District 
|-
! Religion
! Population (1941)
! Percentage (1941)
!Population (2011)
!Percentage (2011)
|-
| Hinduism 
| 846,567
|
| 1,461,140
| 96.76%
|-
| Islam  
| 43,249
|
| 19,797
| 
|-
| Sikhism 
| 4,809 
|
| 8,929
| 0.59%
|-
| Christianity 
| 590 
|
| 3,023
| 
|-
| Others 
| 4,162
|
| 17,186
| 1.14%
|-
| Total Population
| 899,377
| 
| 1,510,075
| 
|}

 Language 

At the 2011 Census, 70.88% of the population in the district spoke Kangri, 14.92% Pahari, 5.55% Hindi, 2.64% Gaddi and 2.06% Punjabi as their first language.

Politics 

Education
 Chaudhary Sarwan Kumar Himachal Pradesh Krishi Vishvavidyalaya
 Central University of Himachal Pradesh 
 College for Higher Tibetan Studies, Sarah
 Government College of Teacher Education Dharamshala
 Himachal Pradesh Board of School Education
 Institute of Himalayan Bioresource Technology , Palampur
 National Institute of Fashion Technology, Kangra

Schools
 Jawahar Navodaya Vidyalaya, Kangra
 Mount Carmel High School, Gaggal, Himachal Pradesh
 Sacred Heart Sr. Sec. School (Sidhpur)
 Sherab Gatsel Lobling School

Notable people

 Anuj Sharma - Singer, second Indian Idol runner-up
 Chander Kumar - Indian politician
 Dalai Lama- Spiritual and religious leader of Tibetans
 G. S. Bali - Indian politician
 Karnail Rana - Himachali folk singer
 Kishan Kapoor - Indian politician
 Captain Saurabh Kalia - Indian Army
 Shanta Kumar - Indian politician
 Brigadier Sher Jung Thapa - Indian Army officer, recipient of Maha Vir Chakra, known as "Hero of Skardu"
 Shriya Sharma - Film actress
 Shivya Pathania - Television actress
 Major General Siri Kanth Korla, DSO, MC, PVSM - Indian Army
 Major Somnath Sharma - Indian Army officer
 Sudhir Sharma - Indian politician
 Captain Vikram Batra - Indian army officer, recipient of Param Vir Chakra

See also

 Agahar
 Chambi, Himachal Pradesh
 Dhanotu
 Harchakian
 Nagrota Surian
 Kangra Valley
 Kangra Valley Railway
 Kangra Fort
 Kangra painting
 List of India cave temples
 List of Caves in India
 List of rock-cut temples in India
 Indian rock-cut architecture
 List of colossal sculpture in situ
 Pit cave
 Raitt, Kangra
 Shamirpur

 Notes and references 

Further reading
 Hutchinson, J. & J. PH Vogel (1933). History of the Panjab Hill States'', Vol. I. 1st edition: Govt. Printing, Punjab, Lahore, 1933. Reprint 2000. Department of Language and Culture, Himachal Pradesh. Chapter V Kangra State, pp. 99–198.

External links

  - Kangra District
 Distt Profile
 Kangra's History
 Temples of Kangra
 Kangra Map

 
Districts of Himachal Pradesh